Stenoma picrantis is a moth in the family Depressariidae. It was described by Edward Meyrick in 1930. It is found in Pará, Brazil.

The wingspan is about 19 mm. The forewings are white, irregularly and suffusedly irrorated light grey, the dorsal half suffused light greyish ochreous. There are some dark fuscous scales indicating a short interrupted longitudinal streak from the base of the costa, and some along the fold anteriorly. A slender dark fuscous costal streak with the extreme costal edge whitish is found from one-sixth to two-thirds, slenderly interrupted at two-fifths, immediately beneath this some brownish suffusion forming irregular patches before and beyond the middle, the first with a spot of blackish irroration, some light yellow-ochreous suffusion beneath this, the second with two elongate blackish spots, the upper small. The plical and second discal stigmata are small and blackish. Beyond two-thirds is an elongate wedge-shaped blackish costal spot, from which a slender greyish line, rather acutely angulated in the middle and curved-sinuate below this, runs to the dorsum towards the tornus. There are also three black marks on the apical part of the costa, some grey suffusion beneath them. There is a terminal series of black dots. The hindwings are grey.

References

Moths described in 1930
Taxa named by Edward Meyrick
Stenoma